The 2007 Junior League World Series took place from August 12–18 in Taylor, Michigan, United States. Pearl City, Hawaii defeated Makati, Philippines in the championship game.

Teams

Results

United States Pool

International Pool

Elimination Round

References

Junior League World Series
Junior League World Series